Maria Antonietta Beluzzi (26 July 1930 – 6 August 1997) was an Italian actress who appeared in a number of films in her native country. She is probably best known as the large and huge-breasted tobacconist in Federico Fellini's Amarcord, whose sexual arousal by the male teenager protagonist ends with ironic results. This casting occurred ten years after Fellini first cast her in an uncredited role (as a screen test candidate for La Saraghina) in 8½.

In a minor plot point, her performance in Amarcord is discussed fondly by the characters in John Irving's Until I Find You (2005).

Filmography

References

External links 
 

1930 births
1997 deaths
Italian film actresses
Actors from Bologna
20th-century Italian actresses